Faqus is a city in the Egyptian governorate of Ash Sharqiyah Governorate. Local attractions include ancient Egyptian monuments in Tell el-Dab'a, Qantir, and Omm Egrim.

History 
Faqus is identical with the ancient city of Phacusa, which was the capital of the nome of Arabia.  It was subsequently mentioned by the medieval geographers Qudama ibn Ja'far, Ibn Khordadbeh, Maqrizi, Istakhri, Ibn Hawqal, and al-Muqaddasi.

The 1885 Census of Egypt recorded Faqus as a nahiyah under the district of Sawaleh in Gharbia Governorate; at that time, the population of the town was 1,610 (836 men and 774 women).

Demographics

References

Notable people
Abdullah al-Sharqawi
Yusuf Idris

See also
 List of cities and towns in Egypt

Populated places in Sharqia Governorate
Towns in Egypt